Clocinnamox is a selective, irreversible μ-opioid receptor antagonist.

References

Acrylamides
Heterocyclic compounds with 5 rings
Chloroarenes
Oxygen heterocycles
Mu-opioid receptor antagonists
Nitrogen heterocycles
Amides
Cyclopropyl compounds